Riccardo Cretella (born 30 July 1994) is an Italian professional footballer who plays as a midfielder for  club Grosseto.

Club career
Cretella started his career in Lega Pro Seconda Divisione club Gavorrano.

On 13 August 2018, Cretella signed for his hometown Eccellenza club Grosseto. He followed Grosseto to two promotions to Serie D and then Serie C.

References

External links
 
 

1994 births
Living people
People from Grosseto
Footballers from Tuscany
Sportspeople from the Province of Grosseto
Italian footballers
Association football midfielders
Serie C players
Lega Pro Seconda Divisione players
Serie D players
Eccellenza players
U.S. Gavorrano players
S.S. Teramo Calcio players
U.S. Grosseto 1912 players
U.S. Livorno 1915 players